John Badger Bachelder (September 29, 1825 – December 22, 1894) was a portrait and landscape painter, lithographer, and photographer, but best known as the preeminent 19th-century historian of the Battle of Gettysburg in the American Civil War. He was a dominant factor in the preservation and memorialization of the Gettysburg Battlefield in the latter part of the century.

Early life
Bachelder was born in Gilmanton, New Hampshire. He was educated at Captain Alden Partridge's Military School in Pembroke and then at an academy in Gilmanton. He eventually moved to Reading, Pennsylvania, to work at a school that would later become known as the Pennsylvania Military Institute, becoming its principal in 1851. He became involved with the Pennsylvania state militia and was appointed a colonel in 1852, a title that was associated with him the rest of his life.

In 1853 Bachelder returned to New Hampshire, where he married Elizabeth Barber Stevens, and began his career as an artist. Elizabeth was a niece to Gen. Benjamin Butler. From his brief association with military topics, he retained a lifelong interest in them, and when the Civil War began in 1861, he was already collecting notes on Bunker Hill, planning to paint an accurate rendition of the battle. When he realized that reliable materials were hard to locate, he decided to accompany the Union Army of the Potomac in hopes of being present at a decisive battle. There, he would be able to examine the topography of the battlefield, interview participants, and publish a written and illustrated history of the battle.

Bachelder was a welcome accompaniment to the Army, as evidenced by a number of letters in his personal papers from prominent generals who complimented him on his work. For example, Brig. Gen. John C. Caldwell wrote in early 1863, "At Fair Oaks, Virginia, I frequently met Mr. Bachelder, at that time making sketches of various phases of the Battle of Seven Pines and Fair Oaks. Several of the sketches were shown to me, and I think them by far the most accurate of any I have ever seen."

Gettysburg

Bachelder's most noted work, which would occupy a good portion of the remainder of his life, was after the Battle of Gettysburg, July 1–3, 1863. He studied the terrain via horseback and drew an isometric map of the battlefield. He visited field hospitals, interviewed wounded soldiers of both armies, and determined the position on his map of every unit engaged in the battle. That fall he published a panoramic view of Gettysburg. During visits to the Army's winter quarters, he claims to have interviewed the commanders of every regiment and battery in the Army of the Potomac. He later organized reunions on the field and accompanied veterans over the terrain and placed wooden stakes into the ground to identify important points of the battle.

In 1870, noted artist James Walker was commissioned by Bachelder to paint an account of Pickett's Charge, entitled "The Repulse of Longstreet's Assault at the Battle of Gettysburg," a massive work that measured 7.5 by 20 feet. Bachelder wrote an accompanying guidebook and toured widely with the canvas, lecturing across the United States. In 1873, he published a guidebook to the battle, which was well received by the public.

Bachelder's contribution to Gettysburg was more than artistic. From 1883 to 1887, he served in the position as Superintendent of Tablets and Legends for the Gettysburg Battlefield Memorial Association, and is probably responsible more than any man for the placement of monuments and battlefield markers, both Union and Confederate. He coined the phrase "Copse of Trees" and invented the concept of a "High Water Mark of the Confederacy" at which the famous Pickett's Charge peaked. All but a few monuments on the battlefield bear some of his influence.

In 1880, President Rutherford B. Hayes signed into law a bill that provided $50,000 to Bachelder to write a detailed history of the battle of Gettysburg. Bachelder based his manuscript on the Official Records and the interviews he had done, but he has been criticized by some historians because his personal interviews, which would be considered more accurate than reports compiled years after the event, affected only about 10% of the 2,550 pages that he sent to Washington in October 1886. Southern historians also complained that he chose to interview very few Confederate officers.

Bachelder's activities at Gettysburg were described in detail by Senator Wade Hampton of South Carolina on March 17, 1880, in a report to the Senate from its Military Affairs Committee:

Death

Bachelder died of pneumonia in Hyde Park, Massachusetts, in 1894. His body was then transported the 79 miles to be buried alongside his only child, Charlotte who had died at age 13. Their graves are located in a small family cemetery on Stevens Hill Road in Nottingham, New Hampshire, close to the family home. His widow, Elizabeth, died in 1914 and was interred alongside her husband and daughter.

References

Further reading
 Bachelder, John B. The Bachelder Papers: Gettysburg in Their Own Words. Edited by David L. Ladd and Audrey J. Ladd. 3 vols. Dayton, OH: Morningside Press, 1994. .
 Desjardin, Thomas A. These Honored Dead: How the Story of Gettysburg Shaped American Memory. .

External links
 
 John B. Bachelder at American Art Gallery
 National Park Service history

	

1825 births
1894 deaths
People of the American Civil War
19th-century American historians
19th-century American male writers
Historians of the American Civil War
Deaths from pneumonia in Massachusetts
People from Gilmanton, New Hampshire
American male non-fiction writers